In computer storage, cold data refers to data that is rarely accessed, therefore considered "cold". Cold data is the opposite of hot data, which is data that is frequently accessed. To optimize storage costs, cold data can be stored on lower performing and less expensive storage media. For example, solid state disks may be used for storing hot data, while cold data can be moved to hard drives, optical discs, tapes or migrated to cloud storage.

See also
 Hierarchical storage management
 Cache (computing)
 Sneakernet

References

Data storage
Computer data storage